Ngau Liu is tha name of several places in Hong Kong:
 Ngau Liu (near Sha Kok Mei), near Sha Kok Mei in Sai Kung District
 Ngau Liu (near Tai Lam Wu), near Tai Lam Wu in Sai Kung District